Within general relativity (GR), Einstein's relativistic gravity, the gravitational field is described by the 10-component metric tensor. However, in Newtonian gravity, which is a limit of GR, the gravitational field is described by a single component Newtonian gravitational potential. This raises the question to identify the Newtonian potential within the metric, and to identify the physical interpretation of the remaining 9 fields.

The definition of the non-relativistic gravitational fields provides the answer to this question, and thereby describes the image of the metric tensor in Newtonian physics. These fields are not strictly non-relativistic. Rather, they apply to the non-relativistic (or post-Newtonian) limit of GR.

A reader who is familiar with electromagnetism (EM) will benefit from the following analogy. In EM, one is familiar with the electrostatic potential  and the magnetic vector potential . Together, they combine into the 4-vector potential , which is compatible with relativity. This relation can be thought to represent the non-relativistic decomposition of the electromagnetic 4-vector potential. This expansion is known as the post-Coulombic expansion.

Definition

In the non-relativistic limit, of weak gravity and non-relativistic velocities, general relativity reduces to Newtonian gravity. Going beyond the strict limit, corrections can be organized into a perturbation theory known as the post-Newtonian expansion. As part of that, the metric gravitational field , is redefined and decomposed into the non-relativistic gravitational (NRG) fields  :  is the Newtonian potential,  is known as the gravito-magnetic vector potential, and finally  is a 3d symmetric tensor known as the spatial metric perturbation. The field redefinition is given by

In components, this is equivalent to

where .

Counting components,  has 10, while  has 1,  has 3 and finally  has 6. Hence, in terms of components, the decomposition reads .

Motivation for definition 
In the post-Newtonian limit, bodies move slowly compared with the speed of light, and hence the gravitational field is also slowly changing. Approximating the fields to be time independent, the Kaluza-Klein reduction (KK) was adapted to apply to the time direction. Recall that in its original context, the KK reduction applies to fields which are independent of a compact spatial fourth direction. In short, the NRG decomposition is a Kaluza-Klein reduction over time.

Relation with standard approximations 
By definition, the post-Newtonian expansion assumes a weak field approximation. Within the first order perturbation to the metric , where  is the Minkowski metric, we find the standard weak field decomposition into a scalar, vector and tensor , which is similar to the non-relativistic gravitational (NRG) fields. The importance of the NRG fields is that they provide a non-linear extension, thereby facilitating computation at higher orders in the weak field / post-Newtonian expansion. Summarizing, the NRG fields are adapted for higher order post-Newtonian expansion.

Physical interpretation
The scalar field   is interpreted as the Newtonian gravitational potential.

The vector field  is interpreted as the gravito-magnetic vector potential. It is magnetic-like, or analogous to the magnetic vector potential in electromagnetism (EM). In particular, it is sourced by massive currents (the analogue of charge currents in EM), namely by momentum. 

As a result, the gravito-magnetic vector potential is responsible for current-current interaction, which appears at the 1st post-Newtonian order. In particular, it generates a repulsive contribution to the force between parallel massive currents. However, this repulsion is overturned by the standard Newtonian gravitational attraction, since in gravity a current "wire" must always be massive (charged) -- unlike EM.

The symmetric tensor  is known as the spatial metric perturbation. From the 2nd post-Newtonian order and onward, it must be accounted for. Hence it becomes a strong analogue of electromagnetism, an analogy known as gravitoelectromagnetism.

Applications and generalizations
The two body problem in general relativity holds both intrinsic interest and observational, astrophysical interest. In particular, it is used to describe the motion of binary compact objects, which are the sources for gravitational waves. As such, the study of this problem is essential for both detection and interpretation of gravitational waves.

Within this two body problem, the effects of GR are captured by the two body effective potential, which is expanded within the post-Newtonian approximation. Non-relativistic gravitational fields were found to economize the determination of this two body effective potential.

Generalizations 
In higher dimensions, with an arbitrary spacetime dimension , the definition of non-relativistic gravitational fields generalizes into 

Substituting  reproduces the standard 4d definition above.

References 

General relativity